Douglas Andrew Bell (born February 24, 1961)
is a computer game developer, best known for his role as the lead designer and programmer for the Dungeon Master series of computer games, which met with critical success, from San Diego studio FTL Games.

Work
Doug Bell worked as director, lead designer and developer for Dungeon Master. But before he joined in 1983 FTL Games, the game was titled Crystal Dragon, and developed together with Andy Jaros (Artwork) in their development studio PVC Dragon for the 8-bit Apple II computer. Then after the merger, the game was rescheduled to be launched after the release, and for the target platform of the 16-bit Atari ST computer, which offered more possibilities. Bell was the lead developer and technical director of FTL from 1986 until 1995, the company ceased operations in 1996.

Game credits
Lead programmer for the Atari ST version of SunDog: Frozen Legacy (1985)
Lead developer for Dungeon Master (1987) (also did the X68000 port of Dungeon Master)
Project manager and developer for Chaos Strikes Back (1989)
Lead developer for Dungeon Master II: The Legend of Skullkeep (1993)
Trion Network Platform for the 2013 title Defiance (Trion).

Other commercial software
Developed the Research Assistant module for the Encyclopædia Britannica CD (2000, 2001)

Bibliography

References

External links

1961 births
Living people
American computer programmers
American video game designers